On 25 October 2021, gunmen attacked a mosque in the northern Nigerian state of Niger during Fajr prayers. They killed 17 worshippers and an imam and injured four other people.

The mass shooting took place in the village of Mazakuka in the Mashegu area of Niger State. The assailants, who are believed to belong to the Fulani ethnic group, fled after the shooting.

References

2021 murders in Nigeria
2021 mass shootings in Africa
2020s massacres in Nigeria
21st century in Niger State
Attacks on buildings and structures in 2021
Attacks on mosques in Africa
Attacks on religious buildings and structures in Nigeria
Crime in Niger State
Mass shootings in Nigeria
Massacres in 2021
Mosque shootings
October 2021 crimes in Africa
October 2021 events in Africa
Terrorist incidents in Nigeria in 2021